Noapara is a major town and municipality in Jessore District in the division of Khulna, Bangladesh. It is one of the major urban centres of Abhaynagar Upazila.

References 

Populated places in Khulna Division
Towns in Bangladesh